The 2020 Ohio House of Representatives Election was held on November 3, 2020, with the primary election held on April 28, 2020. Ohio voters elected state representatives in the 99 Ohio House of Representatives districts. State representatives elected in 2020 will be eligible to serve a two-year term beginning January 2021 and ending December 2022. These elections will coincide with elections for U.S. President and the Ohio Senate.

Democrats hoped they could break the Republican supermajority in the chamber given their strength in suburban districts in 2018 and the fallout of the Ohio nuclear bribery scandal. However, further Democratic gains failed to materialize and Republicans picked up four seats along the state's eastern border, further consolidating their control.

Predictions

Statewide results

Closest races 
Seats where the margin of victory was under 10%:
 
  gain
 
  gain
 
 
 
 
  
  
  
  gain

Results by district

Overview 

|}

Detailed Results

District 1 


Primary results

General election results

District 2

Primary results

General election results

District 3

Primary results

General election results

District 4

Primary results

General election results

District 5

Primary results

General election results

District 6

Primary results

General election results

District 7

Primary results

General election results

District 8

Primary results

General election results

District 9

Primary results

General election results

District 10

Primary results

General election results

District 11

Primary results

General election results

District 12

Primary results

General election results

District 13

Primary results

General election results

District 14

Primary results

General election results

District 15

Primary results

General election results

District 16

Primary results

Polling

General election results

District 17

Primary results

General election results

District 18

Primary results

General election results

District 19

Primary results

General election results

District 20

Primary results

General election results

District 21

Primary results

General election results

District 22

Primary results

General election results

District 23

Primary results

Polling

General election results

District 24

Primary results

General election results

District 25

Primary results

General election results

District 26

Primary results

General election results

District 27

Primary results

Polling

General election results

District 28

Primary results

General election results

District 29

Primary results

General election results

District 30

Primary results

General election results

District 31

Primary results

General election results

District 32

Primary results

General election results

District 33

Primary results

General election results

District 34

Primary results

General election results

District 35

Primary results

General election results

District 36

Primary results

Polling

General election results

District 37

Primary results

Polling

General election results

District 38

Primary results

General election results

District 39

Primary results

General election results

District 40

Primary results

General election results

District 41

Primary results

General election results

District 42

Primary results

General election results

District 43

Primary results

Polling

General election results

District 44

Primary results

General election results

District 45

Primary results

General election results

District 46

Primary results

General election results

District 47

Primary results

General election results

District 48

Primary results

General election results

District 49

Primary results

General election results

District 50

Primary results

General election results

District 51

Primary results

General election results

District 52

Primary results

General election results

District 53

Primary results

General election results

District 54

Primary results

General election results

District 55

Primary results

General election results

District 56

Primary results

General election results

District 57

Primary results

General election results

District 58

Primary results

General election results

District 59

Primary results

General election results

District 60

Primary results

General election results

District 61

Primary results

General election results

District 62

Primary results

General election results

District 63

Primary results

General election results

District 64

Primary results

General election results

District 65

Primary results

General election results

District 66

Primary results

General election results

District 67

Primary results

General election results

District 68

Primary results

General election results

District 69

Primary results

General election results

District 70

Primary results

General election results

District 71

Primary results

General election results

District 72

Primary results

General election results

District 73

Primary results

General election results

District 74

Primary results

General election results

District 75

Primary results

General election results

District 76

Primary results

General election results

District 77

Primary results

General election results

District 78

Primary results

General election results

District 79

Primary results

General election results

District 80

Primary results

General election results

District 81

Primary results

General election results

District 82

Primary results

General election results

District 83

Primary results

General election results

District 84

Primary results

General election results

District 85

Primary results

General election results

District 86

Primary results

General election results

District 87

Primary results

General election results

District 88

Primary results

General election results

District 89

Primary results

Polling

General election results

District 90

Primary results

General election results

District 91

Primary results

General election results

District 92

Primary results

General election results

District 93

Primary results

General election results

District 94

Primary results

General election results

District 95

Primary results

General election results

District 96

Primary results

General election results

District 97

Primary results

General election results

District 98

Primary results

General election results

District 99

Primary results

General election results

See also
 2020 Ohio elections

Notes

References

External links
  (State affiliate of the U.S. League of Women Voters)

 
 
 

Ohio House
2020 Ohio elections
Politics of Ohio
Ohio House of Representatives elections